Acinic cell carcinoma of the lung is a very rare malignant neoplasm originating from bronchial glands. It is classified as a salivary gland-like carcinoma under the most widely used lung cancer classification system.

References

External links 
 Lung Cancer Home Page The National Cancer Institute site containing further reading and resources about lung cancer.
 World Health Organization Histological Classification of Lung and Pleural Tumours. 4th Edition.

Lung cancer